The 10th New York State Legislature, consisting of the New York State Senate and the New York State Assembly, met from January 12 to April 21, 1787, during the tenth year of George Clinton's governorship, at the Old Royal Exchange in New York City.

Background
Under the provisions of the New York Constitution of 1777, the State Senators were elected on general tickets in the senatorial districts, and were then divided into four classes. Six senators each drew lots for a term of 1, 2, 3 or 4 years and, beginning at the election in April 1778, every year six Senate seats came up for election to a four-year term. Assemblymen were elected countywide on general tickets to a one-year term, the whole assembly being renewed annually.

In March 1786, the Legislature enacted that future Legislatures meet on the first Tuesday of January of each year unless called earlier by the governor. No general meeting place was determined, leaving it to each Legislature to name the place where to reconvene, and if no place could be agreed upon, the Legislature should meet again where it adjourned.

Elections
The State election was held from April 25 to 27, 1786. Gov. George Clinton and Lt. Gov. Pierre Van Cortlandt were re-elected to a fourth term. Senators Lewis Morris (Southern D.), John Williams (Eastern D.) and Abraham Yates Jr. (Western D.) were re-elected; and John Hathorn (Middle D.), Peter Schuyler (Western D.) and Assemblyman John Vanderbilt (Southern D.), were elected to the Senate.

Sessions
The State Legislature was to meet on January 2, 1787, at the Old Royal Exchange in New York City, but the Assembly first assembled a quorum on January 12, the Senate on January 13; both Houses adjourned on April 21, 1787.

State Senate

Districts
The Southern District (9 seats) consisted of Kings, New York, Queens, Richmond, Suffolk and Westchester counties.
The Middle District (6 seats) consisted of Dutchess, Orange and Ulster counties.
The Eastern District (3 seats) consisted of Washington, Cumberland and Gloucester counties.
The Western District (6 seats) consisted of Albany and Montgomery counties.

Note: There are now 62 counties in the State of New York. The counties which are not mentioned in this list had not yet been established, or sufficiently organized, the area being included in one or more of the abovementioned counties.

Members
The asterisk (*) denotes members of the previous Legislature who continued in office as members of this Legislature. John Vanderbilt changed from the Assembly to the Senate.

Employees
Clerk: Abraham B. Bancker

State Assembly

Districts
The City and County of Albany (10 seats)
Cumberland County (3 seats)
Dutchess County (7 seats)
Gloucester County (2 seats)
Kings County (2 seats)
Montgomery County) (6 seats)
The City and County of New York (9 seats)
Orange County (4 seats)
Queens County (4 seats)
Richmond County (2 seats)
Suffolk County (5 seats)
Ulster County (6 seats)
Washington County (4 seats)
Westchester County (6 seats)

Note: There are now 62 counties in the State of New York. The counties which are not mentioned in this list had not yet been established, or sufficiently organized, the area being included in one or more of the abovementioned counties.

Assemblymen
The asterisk (*) denotes members of the previous Legislature who continued as members of this Legislature.

Employees
Clerk: John McKesson

Notes

Sources
The New York Civil List compiled by Franklin Benjamin Hough (Weed, Parsons and Co., 1858) [see pg. 108 for Senate districts; pg. 113 for senators; pg. 148f for Assembly districts; pg. 163 for assemblymen]

1786 in New York (state)
1787 in New York (state)
010